The Col. Sidney Berry House is a historic house located at 725 West River Road in Northumberland, Saratoga County, New York.

Description and history 
It was built in about 1800, and is a two-story, five-by-two-bay, timber-framed gable-roofed residence. It consists of a rectangular main block and an additional -story rear wing. It features a Federal style entrance and Greek Revival period details on the interior added with a renovation about 1850.

It was added to the National Register of Historic Places on December 12, 2003.

References

Houses on the National Register of Historic Places in New York (state)
Federal architecture in New York (state)
Greek Revival houses in New York (state)
Houses completed in 1800
Houses in Saratoga County, New York
National Register of Historic Places in Saratoga County, New York